Luxembourg, officially the Grand Duchy of Luxembourg, is a small landlocked country in Western Europe. It borders Belgium to the west and north, Germany to the east, and France to the south. Its capital and most populous city, Luxembourg, is one of the four institutional seats of the European Union (together with Brussels, Frankfurt, and Strasbourg) and the seat of several EU institutions, notably the Court of Justice of the European Union, the highest judicial authority. Luxembourg's culture, people, and languages are highly intertwined with its French and German neighbors; while Luxembourgish is the only national language of the Luxembourgish people, French is the only legal language, and all three — Luxembourgish, French and German — are considered official languages and are used for administrative matters in the country.

In 2022, it had a population of 645,397, which makes it one of the least-populated countries in Europe, albeit with the highest population growth rate; foreigners account for nearly half the population. Luxembourg is a representative democracy headed by a constitutional monarch, Grand Duke Henri, making it the world's only remaining sovereign grand duchy.

Luxembourg is a developed country with an advanced economy and one of the world's highest GDP (PPP) per capita. The city of Luxembourg was declared a UNESCO World Heritage Site in 1994 due to the exceptional preservation of its vast fortifications and historic quarters. Luxembourg is a founding member of the European Union, OECD, the United Nations, NATO, and the Benelux. It served on the United Nations Security Council for the first time in 2013 and 2014.

History 
The history of Luxembourg is considered to begin in the year 963, when Count Siegfried acquired a rocky promontory and its Roman-era fortifications, known as Lucilinburhuc, "little castle", and the surrounding area from the Imperial Abbey of St. Maximin in nearby Trier. Siegfried's descendants increased their territory through marriage, conquest, and vassalage. By the end of the 13th century, the counts of Luxembourg reigned over a considerable territory. In 1308, Count of Luxembourg Henry VII became King of the Romans and later Holy Roman Emperor; the House of Luxembourg would produce four Holy Roman Emperors during the High Middle Ages. In 1354, Charles IV elevated the county to the Duchy of Luxembourg. The duchy eventually became part of the Burgundian Circle and then one of the Seventeen Provinces of the Habsburg Netherlands.
Over the centuries, the City and Fortress of Luxembourg—of great strategic importance due to its location between the Kingdom of France and the Habsburg territories—was gradually built up to be one of the most reputed fortifications in Europe. After belonging to both the France of Louis XIV and the Austria of Maria Theresa, Luxembourg became part of the First French Republic and Empire under Napoleon.

The present-day state of Luxembourg first emerged at the Congress of Vienna in 1815. The Grand Duchy, with its powerful fortress, became an independent state under the personal possession of William I of the Netherlands with a Prussian garrison to guard the city against another invasion from France. In 1839, following the turmoil of the Belgian Revolution, the purely French-speaking part of Luxembourg was ceded to Belgium and the Luxembourgish-speaking part (except the Arelerland, the area around Arlon) became what is the present state of Luxembourg.

Before AD 963 

The first traces of settlement in what is now Luxembourg are dated back to the Paleolithic Age, about 35,000 years ago. From the 2nd century BC, Celtic tribes settled in the region between the rivers Rhine and Meuse.

Six centuries later, the Romans would name the Celtic tribes inhabiting these exact regions collectively as the Treveri. Multiple examples of archeological evidence proving their existence in Luxembourg have been discovered, the most famous being the Oppidum of the Titelberg]].

In around 58 to 51 BC, the Romans invaded the country when Julius Caesar conquered Gaul and part of Germania up to the Rhine border, thus the area of what is now Luxembourg became part of the Roman Empire for the next 450 years, living in relative peace under the Pax Romana.

Similar to those in Gaul, the Celts of Luxembourg adopted Roman culture, language, morals and a way of life, effectively becoming what historians later described as Gallo-Roman civilization. Evidence from that period of time includes the Dalheim Ricciacum and the Vichten mosaic, on display at the National Museum of History and Art in Luxembourg City.

The territory was infiltrated by the Germanic Franks from the 4th century, and was abandoned by Rome in AD 406, after which it became part of the Kingdom of the Franks. The Salian Franks who settled in the area are often described as the ones having brought the Germanic language to present-day Luxembourg, since the old Frankish language spoken by them is considered by linguists to be a direct forerunner of the Moselle Franconian dialect, which later evolved, among others, into the modern-day Luxembourgish language.

The Christianization of Luxembourg is usually dated back to the end of the 7th century. The most famous figure in this context is Willibrord, a Northumbrian missionary saint, who together with other monks established the Abbey of Echternach in AD 698 and is celebrated annually in the dancing procession of Echternach. For a few centuries the abbey would become one of northern Europe's most influential abbeys. The Codex Aureus of Echternach, an important surviving codex written entirely in gold ink, was produced here in the 11th century. The so-called Emperor's Bible and the Golden Gospels of Henry III were also produced in Echternach at this time.

Emergence and expansion of the County of Luxemburg (963–1312) 

When the Carolingian Empire was divided multiple times starting with the Treaty of Verdun in 843, today's Luxembourgish territory became successively part of the Kingdom of Middle Francia (843–855), the Kingdom of Lotharingia (855–959) and finally of the Duchy of Lorraine (959–1059), which itself had become a state of the Holy Roman Empire.

The recorded history of Luxembourg begins with the acquisition of Lucilinburhuc (today Luxembourg Castle) situated on the Bock rock by Siegfried, Count of the Ardennes, in 963 through an exchange act with St. Maximin's Abbey, Trier. Around this fort, a town gradually developed, which became the center of a state of great strategic value within the Duchy of Lorraine. Over the years, the fortress was extended by Siegfried's descendants and by 1083, one of them, Conrad I, was the first to call himself a "Count of Luxembourg", and with it effectively creating the independent County of Luxembourg (which was still a state within the Holy Roman Empire).

By the middle of the 13th century, the counts of Luxembourg had managed to considerably gain in wealth and power, and had expanded their territory from the river Meuse to the Moselle. By the time of the reign of Henry V the Blonde, Bitburg, La Roche-en-Ardenne, Durbuy, Arlon, Thionville, Marville, Longwy, and in 1264 the competing County of Vianden (and with it St. Vith and Schleiden) had either been incorporated directly or become vassal states to the County of Luxembourg. The only major setback during their rise in power came in 1288, when Henry VI and his three brothers died at the Battle of Worringen, while trying unsuccessfully to also add the Duchy of Limburg into their realm. But despite the defeat, the Battle of Worringen helped the Counts of Luxembourg to achieve military glory, which they had previously lacked, as they had mostly enlarged their territory by means of inheritances, marriages and fiefdoms.

The ascension of the Counts of Luxembourg culminated when Henry VII became King of the Romans, King of Italy and finally, in 1312, Holy Roman Emperor.

Golden Age: The House of Luxembourg contending for supremacy in Central Europe (1312–1443) 

With the ascension of Henry VII as Emperor, the dynasty of the House of Luxembourg not only began to rule the Holy Roman Empire, but rapidly began to exercise growing influence over other parts of Central Europe as well.

Henry's son, John the Blind, in addition to being Count of Luxembourg, also became King of Bohemia. He remains a major figure in Luxembourgish history and folklore and is considered by many historians the epitome of chivalry in medieval times. He is also known for having founded the Schueberfouer in 1340 and for his heroic death at the Battle of Crécy in 1346. John the Blind is considered a national hero in Luxembourg.

In the 14th and early 15th centuries, three more members of the House of Luxembourg reigned as Holy Roman Emperors and Bohemian Kings: John's descendants Charles IV, Sigismund (who also was King of Hungary and Croatia), and Wenceslaus IV. Charles IV created the long-lasting Golden Bull of 1356, a decree which fixed important aspects of the constitutional structure of the Empire. Luxembourg remained an independent fief (county) of the Holy Roman Empire, and in 1354, Charles IV elevated it to the status of a duchy with his half-brother Wenceslaus I becoming the first Duke of Luxembourg. While his kin were occupied ruling and expanding their power within the Holy Roman Empire and elsewhere, Wenceslaus, annexed the County of Chiny in 1364, and with it, the territories of the new Duchy of Luxembourg reached its greatest extent.

During these 130 years, the House of Luxembourg was contending with the House of Habsburg for supremacy within the Holy Roman Empire and Central Europe. It all came to end in 1443, when the House of Luxembourg suffered a succession crisis, precipitated by the lack of a male heir to assume the throne. Since Sigismund and Elizabeth of Görlitz were both heirless, all possessions of the Luxembourg Dynasty were redistributed among the European aristocracy. The Duchy of Luxembourg become a possession of Philip the Good, Duke of Burgundy.

As the House of Luxembourg had become extinct and Luxembourg now became part of the Burgundian Netherlands, this would mark the start of nearly 400 years of foreign rule over Luxembourg.

Luxembourg under Habsburg rule and repeated French invasions (1444–1794) 

In 1482, Philip the Handsome inherited all of what became then known as the Habsburg Netherlands, and with it the Duchy of Luxembourg. For nearly 320 years Luxembourg would remain a possession of the mighty House of Habsburg, at first under Austrian rule (1506–1556), then under Spanish rule (1556–1714), before going back again to Austrian rule (1714–1794).
With having become a Habsburg possession, the Duchy of Luxembourg became, like many countries in Europe at the time, heavily involved into the many conflicts for dominance of Europe between the Habsburg-held countries and the Kingdom of France.
 
In 1542, the King of France, Francois I, invaded Luxembourg twice, but the Habsburgs under Charles V managed to reconquer the Duchy each time.

Luxembourg became part of the Spanish Netherlands in 1556, and when France and Spain went to war in 1635 it resulted in the Treaty of the Pyrenees, in which the first partition of Luxembourg was decided. Under the Treaty, Spain ceded the Luxembourgish fortresses of Stenay, Thionville, and Montmédy, and the surrounding territory to France, effectively reducing the size of Luxembourg for the first time in centuries.

In context of the Nine Years' War in 1684, France invaded Luxembourg again, conquering and occupying the Duchy until 1697 when it was returned to the Spanish in order to garner support for the Bourbon cause during the prelude to the War of the Spanish Succession. When the war broke out in 1701 Luxembourg and the Spanish Netherlands were administered by the pro-French faction under the governor Maximilian II Emanuel, Elector of Bavaria and sided with the Bourbons. The duchy was subsequently occupied by the pro-Austrian allied forces during the conflict and was awarded to Austria at its conclusion in 1714.

As the Duchy of Luxembourg repeatedly passed back and forth from Spanish and Austrian to French rule, each of the conquering nations contributed to strengthening and expanding the Fortress that the Castle of Luxembourg had become over the years. One example of this includes French military engineer Marquis de Vauban who advanced the fortifications around and on the heights of the city, fortification walls that are still visible today.

Luxembourg under French rule (1794–1815) 

During the War of the First Coalition, Revolutionary France invaded the Austrian Netherlands, and with it, Luxembourg, yet again. In the years 1793 and 1794 most of the Duchy was conquered relatively fast and the French Revolutionary Army committed many atrocities and pillages against the Luxembourgish civilian population and abbeys, the most infamous being the massacres of Differdange and Dudelange, as well as the destruction of the abbeys of Clairefontaine, Echternach and Orval. However the Fortress of Luxembourg resisted for nearly 7 months before the Austrian forces holding it surrendered. Luxembourg's long defense led Lazare Carnot to call Luxembourg "the best fortress in the world, except Gibraltar", giving rise to the city's nickname the Gibraltar of the North.

Luxembourg was annexed by France, becoming the département des forêts (department of forests), and the incorporation of the former Duchy as a département into France was formalised at the Treaty of Campo Formio in 1797.
From the start of the occupation the new French officials in Luxembourg, who spoke only French, implemented many republican reforms, among them the principle of laicism, which led to an outcry in strongly Catholic Luxembourg. Additionally French was implemented as the only official language and Luxembourgish people were barred access to all civil services. When the French Army introduced military duty for the local population, riots broke out which culminated in 1798 when Luxembourgish peasants started a rebellion. Even though the French managed to rapidly suppress this revolt called Klëppelkrich, it had a profound effect on the historical memory of the country and its citizens.

However, many republican ideas of this era continue to have a lasting effect on Luxembourg: one of the many examples features the implementation of the Napoleonic Code Civil which was introduced in 1804 and is still valid today.

National awakening and independence (1815–1890) 
After the defeat of Napoleon in 1815, the Duchy of Luxembourg was restored. However, as the territory had been part of the Holy Roman Empire as well as the Habsburgian Netherlands in the past, both the Kingdom of Prussia and the United Kingdom of the Netherlands now claimed possession of the territory. At the Congress of Vienna the great powers decided that Luxembourg would become a member state of the newly formed German Confederation, but at the same time William I of the Netherlands, the King of the Netherlands, would become, in personal union, the head of state. To satisfy Prussia, it was decided that not only the Fortress of Luxembourg be manned by Prussian troops, but also that large parts of Luxembourgish territory (mainly the areas around Bitburg and St. Vith) become Prussian possessions. This marked the second time that the Duchy of Luxembourg was reduced in size, and is generally known as the Second Partition of Luxembourg. To compensate the Duchy for this loss, it was decided to elevate the Duchy to a Grand-Duchy, thus giving the Dutch monarchs the additional title of Grand-Duke of Luxembourg.

After Belgium became an independent country following the victorious Belgian Revolution of 1830–1831, it claimed the entire Grand-Duchy of Luxembourg as being part of Belgium, however, the Dutch King who was also Grand Duke of Luxembourg, as well as Prussia, did not want to lose their grip on the mighty fortress of Luxembourg and did not agree with the Belgian claims. The dispute would be solved at the 1839 Treaty of London where the decision of the Third Partition of Luxembourg was taken. This time the territory was reduced by more than half, as the predominantly francophone western part of the country (but also the then Luxembourgish-speaking part of Arelerland) was transferred to the new state of Belgium and with it giving Luxembourg its modern-day borders. The treaty of 1839 also established full independence of the remaining Germanic-speaking Grand-Duchy of Luxembourg.

In 1842 Luxembourg joined the German Customs Union (Zollverein). This resulted in the opening of the German market, the development of Luxembourg's steel industry, and expansion of Luxembourg's railway network from 1855 to 1875.

After the Luxembourg Crisis of 1866 nearly led to war between Prussia and France, as both were unwilling to see the other taking influence over Luxembourg and its mighty fortress, the Grand Duchy's independence and neutrality were reaffirmed by the Second Treaty of London and Prussia was finally willing to withdraw its troops from the Fortress of Luxembourg under the condition that the fortifications would be dismantled. That happened the same year. At the time of the Franco-Prussian war in 1870, Luxembourg's neutrality was respected, and neither France nor Germany invaded the country.

As a result of the recurring disputes between the major European powers, the people of Luxembourg gradually developed a consciousness of independence and a national awakening took place in the 19th century. The people of Luxembourg began referring to themselves as Luxembourgers, rather than being part of one of the larger surrounding nations. This consciousness of Mir wëlle bleiwe wat mir sinn culminated in 1890, when the last step towards full independence was finally taken: due to a succession crisis the Dutch monarchy ceased to hold the title Grand-Duke of Luxembourg. Beginning with Adolph of Nassau-Weilburg, the Grand-Duchy would have their own monarchy, thus reaffirming its full independence.

Two German occupations and interwar political crisis (1890–1945) 

In August 1914, during World War I, Imperial Germany violated Luxembourg's neutrality by invading it in order to defeat France. Nevertheless, despite the German occupation, Luxembourg was allowed to maintain much of its independence and political mechanisms. Unaware of the fact that Germany secretly planned to annex the Grand-Duchy in case of a German victory (the Septemberprogramm), the Luxembourgish government continued to pursue a policy of strict neutrality. However, the Luxembourgish population did not believe Germany's good intentions, fearing that Germany would annex Luxembourg. Around 3,700 Luxembourgers served in the French army, of whom 2,000 died. Their sacrifices have been commemorated at the Gëlle Fra.

After the war, Grand-Duchess Marie-Adélaïde, was seen by many people (including the French and Belgian governments) as having collaborated with the Germans and calls for her abdication and the establishment of a Republic became louder. After the retreat of the German army, communists in Luxembourg City and Esch-sur-Alzette tried to establish a soviet worker's republic similar to the ones emerging in Germany, but these attempts lasted only 2 days. 
In November 1918, a motion in the Chamber of Deputies demanding the abolition of the monarchy was defeated narrowly by 21 votes to 19 (with 3 abstentions).

France questioned the Luxembourgish government's, and especially Marie-Adélaïde's, neutrality during the war, and calls for an annexation of Luxembourg to either France or Belgium grew louder in both countries. 
In January 1919, a company of the Luxembourgish Army rebelled, declaring itself to be the army of the new republic, but French troops intervened and put an end to the rebellion. Nonetheless, the disloyalty shown by her own armed forces was too much for Marie-Adélaïde, who abdicated in favor of her sister Charlotte 5 days later. 
The same year, in a popular referendum, 77.8% of the Luxembourgish population declared in favor of maintaining monarchy and rejected the establishment of a republic. 
During this time, Belgium pushed for an annexation of Luxembourg. However, all such claims were ultimately dismissed at the Paris Peace Conference, thus securing Luxembourg's independence.

In 1940, after the outbreak of World War II, Luxembourg's neutrality was violated again when Nazi Germany's Wehrmacht entered the country, "entirely without justification". In contrast to the First World War, under the German occupation of Luxembourg during World War II, the country was treated as German territory and informally annexed to the adjacent province of Nazi Germany, Gau Moselland. This time, Luxembourg did not remain neutral as Luxembourg's government in exile based in London supported the Allies, sending a small group of volunteers who participated in the Normandy invasion, and multiple resistance groups formed inside the occupied country.

With 2.45% of its prewar population killed, and a third of all buildings in Luxembourg being destroyed or heavily damaged (mainly due to the Battle of the Bulge), Luxembourg suffered the highest such loss in Western Europe and its commitment to the Allied war effort was never questioned. Around 1,000-2,500 of Luxembourg's Jews were murdered in the Holocaust.

Modern history: Integration into NATO and European Union (1945–) 

The Grand Duchy became a founding member of the United Nations in 1945. Luxembourg's neutral status under the constitution formally ended in 1948, and in April 1949 it also became a founding member of NATO. During the Cold War, Luxembourg continued its involvements on the side of the Western Bloc. In the early fifties a small contingent of troops fought in the Korean War. 
Luxembourg troops have also deployed to Afghanistan, to support ISAF. 

In the 1950's, Luxembourg became one of the six founding countries of the European Communities, following the 1952 establishment of the European Coal and Steel Community, and subsequent 1958 creations of the European Economic Community and European Atomic Energy Community. In 1993, the former two of these were incorporated into the European Union. With Robert Schuman (one of the founding fathers of the EU), Pierre Werner (considered the father of the Euro), Gaston Thorn, Jacques Santer and Jean-Claude Juncker (all former Presidents of the European Commission), Luxembourgish politicians contributed substantially to the EU's formation and establishment. In 1999, Luxembourg joined the Eurozone. Thereafter, the country was elected non-permanent member of the United Nations Security Council (2013–14).

The steel industry exploiting the Red Lands' rich iron-ore grounds in the beginning of the 20th century drove Luxembourg's industrialization. After the decline of the steel industry in the 1970s, the country focused on establishing itself as a global financial center and developed into the banking hub it is reputed to be. Since the beginning of the 21st century, its governments have focused on developing the country into a knowledge economy, with the founding of the University of Luxembourg and a national space program.

Government and politics 

Luxembourg is described as a "full democracy", with a parliamentary democracy headed by a constitutional monarch. Executive power is exercised by the grand duke and the cabinet, which consists of several other ministers. The Constitution of Luxembourg, the supreme law of Luxembourg, was adopted on 17 October 1868. The grand duke has the power to dissolve the legislature, in which case new elections must be held within three months. But since 1919, sovereignty has resided with the nation, exercised by the grand duke in accordance with the Constitution and the law.

Legislative power is vested in the Chamber of Deputies, a unicameral legislature of sixty members, who are directly elected to five-year terms from four constituencies. A second body, the Council of State (Conseil d'État), composed of 21 ordinary citizens appointed by the grand duke, advises the Chamber of Deputies in the drafting of legislation.

Luxembourg has three lower tribunals (justices de paix; in Esch-sur-Alzette, the city of Luxembourg, and Diekirch), two district tribunals (Luxembourg and Diekirch), and a Superior Court of Justice (Luxembourg), which includes the Court of Appeal and the Court of Cassation. There is also an Administrative Tribunal and an Administrative Court, as well as a Constitutional Court, all of which are located in the capital.

Administrative divisions 

Luxembourg is divided into 12 cantons, which are further divided into 102 communes. Twelve of the communes have city status; the city of Luxembourg is the largest.

Foreign relations 

Luxembourg has long been a prominent supporter of European political and economic integration. In 1921, Luxembourg and Belgium formed the Belgium–Luxembourg Economic Union (BLEU) to create a regime of inter-exchangeable currency and a common customs. Luxembourg is a member of the Benelux Economic Union and was one of the founding members of the European Economic Community (now the European Union). It also participates in the Schengen Group (named after the Luxembourg village of Schengen where the agreements were signed). At the same time, the majority of Luxembourgers have consistently believed that European unity makes sense only in the context of a dynamic transatlantic relationship, and thus have traditionally pursued a pro-NATO, pro-US foreign policy. 

Luxembourg is the site of the Court of Justice of the European Union, the European Court of Auditors, the Statistical Office of the European Union (Eurostat) and other vital EU organs. The Secretariat of the European Parliament is located in Luxembourg, but the Parliament usually meets in Brussels and sometimes in Strasbourg. Luxembourg is also site of the EFTA Court, which is responsible for the three EFTA members who are part of the European Single Market through the EEA Agreement.

Military 

The Luxembourgish army is mostly based in its casern, the Centre militaire Caserne Grand-Duc Jean on the Härebierg in Diekirch. The general staff is based in the capital, the État-Major. The army is under civilian control, with the grand duke as Commander-in-Chief. The Minister for Defense, François Bausch, oversees army operations. The professional head of the army is the Chief of Defense, who answers to the minister and holds the rank of general.

Being landlocked, Luxembourg has no navy. Seventeen NATO AWACS airplanes are registered as aircraft of Luxembourg. In accordance with a joint agreement with Belgium, both countries have put forth funding for one A400M military cargo plane.

Luxembourg has participated in the Eurocorps, has contributed troops to the UNPROFOR and IFOR missions in former Yugoslavia, and has participated with a small contingent in the NATO SFOR mission in Bosnia and Herzegovina. Luxembourg troops have also deployed to Afghanistan, to support ISAF. The army has also participated in humanitarian relief missions such as setting up refugee camps for Kurds and providing emergency supplies to Albania.

Geography 

It lies between latitudes 49° and 51° N, and longitudes 5° and 7° E.

To the east, Luxembourg borders the German Bundesländer of Rhineland-Palatinate and Saarland, and to the south, it borders the French région of Grand Est (Lorraine). The Grand Duchy borders Belgium's Wallonia, in particular the Belgian provinces of Luxembourg and Liège, part of which comprises the German-speaking Community of Belgium, to the west and to the north, respectively.

The northern third of the country is known as the Oesling, and forms part of the Ardennes. Other mountains are the Buurgplaatz at  near Huldange and the Napoléonsgaard at  near Rambrouch. The region is sparsely populated, with only one town (Wiltz) with a population of more than four thousand people.

The southern two-thirds of the country is called the Gutland, and is more densely populated than the Oesling. It is also more diverse and can be divided into five geographic sub-regions. The Luxembourg plateau, in south-central Luxembourg, is a large, flat, sandstone formation, and the site of the city of Luxembourg. Little Switzerland, in the east of Luxembourg, has craggy terrain and thick forests. The Moselle valley is the lowest-lying region, running along the southeastern border. The Red Lands, in the far south and southwest, are Luxembourg's industrial heartland and home to many of Luxembourg's largest towns.

The border between Luxembourg and Germany is formed by three rivers: the Moselle, the Sauer, and the Our. Other major rivers are the Alzette, the Attert, the Clerve, and the Wiltz. The valleys of the mid-Sauer and Attert form the border between the Gutland and the Oesling.

Environment 
According to the 2012 Environmental Performance Index, Luxembourg is one of the world's best performers in environmental protection, ranking 4th out of 132 assessed countries. In 2020, it ranked second out of 180 countries. Luxembourg also ranks 6th among the top ten most livable cities in the world by Mercer's. The country wants to cut GHG emissions by 55% in 10 years and reach zero emissions by 2050. Luxembourg wants to increase its organic farming fivefold. It had a 2019 Forest Landscape Integrity Index mean score of 1.12/10, ranking it 164th globally out of 172 countries.

Climate 
Luxembourg has an oceanic climate (Köppen: Cfb), marked by high precipitation, particularly in late summer. The summers are warm and winters cool.

Economy 

Luxembourg's stable and high-income market economy features moderate growth, low inflation, and a high level of innovation. Unemployment is traditionally low, though it reached 6.1% by May 2012, due largely to the 2008 global financial crisis. In 2011, according to the IMF, Luxembourg was the world's second-richest country, with a per capita GDP on a purchasing-power parity (PPP) basis of $80,119. Its GDP per capita in purchasing power standards was 261% of the EU average (100%) in 2019. Luxembourg ranks 13th in The Heritage Foundation's Index of Economic Freedom, 26th in the United Nations Human Development Index, and 4th in the Economist Intelligence Unit's quality of life index. It ranked 19th in the Global Innovation Index in 2022.

The industrial sector, dominated by steel until the 1960s, has since diversified to include chemicals, rubber, and other products. During recent decades, growth in the financial sector has more than compensated for the decline in steel production. Services, especially banking and finance, account for the majority of the economic output. Luxembourg is the world's second largest investment fund center (after the United States), the most important private banking center in the Eurozone and Europe's leading center for reinsurance companies. Moreover, Luxembourg's government has aimed to attract Internet startups, with Skype and Amazon being two of the many Internet companies that have shifted their regional headquarters to Luxembourg. Other high-tech companies have established themselves in Luxembourg, including 3D scanner developer/manufacturer Artec 3D.

In April 2009, concern about Luxembourg's banking secrecy laws, as well as its reputation as a tax haven, led to its being added to a "gray list" of nations with questionable banking arrangements by the G20. In response, the country soon adopted OECD standards on exchange of information and was subsequently added into the category of "jurisdictions that have substantially implemented the internationally agreed tax standard". In March 2010, the Sunday Telegraph reported that most of Kim Jong-Il's $4 billion in secret accounts was in Luxembourg banks. Amazon.co.uk also benefits from Luxembourg tax loopholes by channeling substantial U.K. revenues, as reported by The Guardian in April 2012. Luxembourg ranked third on the Tax Justice Network's 2011 Financial Secrecy Index of the world's major tax havens, scoring only slightly behind the Cayman Islands. In 2013, Luxembourg was ranked the 2nd safest tax haven in the world, behind Switzerland.

In early November 2014, just days after becoming head of the European Commission, Luxembourg's former Prime Minister Jean-Claude Juncker was hit by media disclosures—derived from a document leak known as Luxembourg Leaks—that Luxembourg had turned into a major European center of corporate tax avoidance under his premiership.

Agriculture employed about 2.1% of Luxembourg's active population in 2010, when there were 2200 agricultural holdings with an average area per holding of 60 hectares.

Luxembourg has especially close trade and financial ties to Belgium and the Netherlands (see Benelux), and as a member of the EU it enjoys the advantages of the open European market.

With $171 billion in May 2015, the country ranked 11th in the world in holdings of U.S. Treasury securities. However, securities owned by non-Luxembourg residents, but held in custodial accounts in Luxembourg, are included in this figure.

, Luxembourg's public debt totaled $15,687,000,000, or $25,554 per capita. The debt to GDP was 22.10%.

The Luxembourg labor market represents 445,000 jobs occupied by 120,000 Luxembourgers, 120,000 foreign residents and 205,000 cross-border commuters. The latter pay their taxes in Luxembourg, but their education and social rights are the responsibility of their country of residence. The same applies to pensioners. Luxembourg's government has never shared its tax revenues with the local authorities on the French border. This system is seen as one of the keys to Luxembourg's economic growth, but at the expense of the border countries.

Transport 

Luxembourg has road, rail and air transport facilities and services. The advent of the high-speed TGV link to Paris has led to renovation of the city's railway station and a new passenger terminal at Luxembourg Airport was opened in 2008. Luxembourg city reintroduced trams in December 2017 and there are plans to open light-rail lines in adjacent areas within the next few years.

There are 681 cars per 1000 persons in Luxembourg—higher than most of other states, and surpassed by the United States, Canada, Australia, New Zealand, Iceland, and other small states like Principality of Monaco, San Marino, Liechtenstein, the British overseas territory of Gibraltar, and Brunei.

On 29 February 2020, Luxembourg became the first country to introduce no-charge public transportation, which will be almost completely funded by public expenditure.

Communications 

The telecommunications industry in Luxembourg is liberalized and the electronic communications networks are significantly developed. Competition between the different operators is guaranteed by the legislative framework Paquet Telecom of the Government of 2011 which transposes the European Telecom Directives into Luxembourgish law. This encourages the investment in networks and services. The regulator ILR – Institut Luxembourgeois de Régulation ensures the compliance to these legal rules.

Luxembourg has modern and widely deployed optical fiber and cable networks throughout the country. In 2010, the Luxembourg Government launched its National strategy for very high-speed networks with the aim to become a global leader in terms of very high-speed broadband by achieving full 1 Gbit/s coverage of the country by 2020. In 2011, Luxembourg had an NGA coverage of 75%. In April 2013 Luxembourg featured the 6th highest download speed worldwide and the 2nd highest in Europe: 32,46 Mbit/s. The country's location in Central Europe, stable economy and low taxes favour the telecommunication industry.

It ranks 2nd in the world in the development of the Information and Communication Technologies in the ITU ICT Development Index and 8th in the Global Broadband Quality Study 2009 by the University of Oxford and the University of Oviedo.

Luxembourg is connected to all major European Internet Exchanges (AMS-IX Amsterdam, DE-CIX Frankfurt, LINX London), datacenters and POPs through redundant optical networks. In addition, the country is connected to the virtual meetme room services (vmmr) of the international data hub operator Ancotel. This enables Luxembourg to interconnect with all major telecommunication operators and data carriers worldwide. The interconnection points are in Frankfurt, London, New York and Hong Kong. Luxembourg has established itself as one of the leading financial technology (FinTech) hubs in Europe, with the Luxembourg government supporting initiatives like the Luxembourg House of Financial Technology.

Some 20 data centers are operating in Luxembourg. Six data centers are Tier IV Design certified: three of ebrc, two of LuxConnect and one of European Data Hub. In a survey on nine international data centers carried out in December 2012 and January 2013 and measuring availability (up-time) and performance (delay by which the data from the requested website was received), the top three positions were held by Luxembourg data centers.

Demographics

Largest towns

Ethnicity 

The people of Luxembourg are called Luxembourgers. The immigrant population increased in the 20th century due to the arrival of immigrants from Belgium, France, Italy, Germany, and Portugal; the latter comprised the largest group.  In 2013 about 88,000 Luxembourg inhabitants possessed Portuguese nationality. In 2013, there were 537,039 permanent residents, 44.5% of which were of foreign background or foreign nationals; the largest foreign ethnic groups were the Portuguese, comprising 16.4% of the total population, followed by the French (6.6%), Italians (3.4%), Belgians (3.3%) and Germans (2.3%). Another 6.4% were of other EU background, while the remaining 6.1% were of other non-EU, but largely other European, background.

Since the beginning of the Yugoslav wars, Luxembourg has seen many immigrants from Bosnia and Herzegovina, Montenegro, and Serbia. Annually, over 10,000 new immigrants arrive in Luxembourg, mostly from the EU states, as well as Eastern Europe. In 2000 there were 162,000 immigrants in Luxembourg, accounting for 37% of the total population. There were an estimated 5,000 illegal immigrants in Luxembourg in 1999.

Language 

As determined by law since 1984, Luxembourg has only one national language, Luxembourgish. It is considered the mother tongue or "language of the heart" for Luxembourgers and the language they generally use to speak or write to each other. Luxembourgish is considered a Franconian language specific to the local population, which is partially mutually intelligible with the neighboring High German, but which also includes more than 5,000 words of French origin. Knowledge of Luxembourgish is a criterion for naturalisation.

In addition to Luxembourgish, French and German are used in administrative and judicial matters, making all three administrative languages of Luxembourg. Per article 4 of the law promulgated in 1984, if a citizen asks a question in Luxembourgish, German or French, the administration must reply, as far as possible, in the language in which the question was asked.

Luxembourg is largely multilingual: , 52% of citizens claimed Luxembourgish as their native language, 16.4% Portuguese, 16% French, 2% German and 13.6% different languages (mostly English, Italian or Spanish). Even though French was the mother tongue of only 16% of residents in Luxembourg (placing 3rd), 98% of its citizens were able to speak it to a high level. The vast majority of Luxembourg residents are able to speak it as a second or third language. , much of the population was able to speak multiple other languages: 80% of citizens reported being able to hold a conversation in English, 78% in German and 77% in Luxembourgish, claiming these languages as their respective second, third or fourth language.

Each of the three official languages is used as a primary language in certain spheres of everyday life, without being exclusive. Luxembourgish is the language that Luxembourgers generally use to speak and write to each other, and there has been a recent increase in the production of novels and movies in the language; at the same time, the numerous expatriate workers (approximately 44% of the population) generally do not use it to speak to each other.

Most official business and written communication is carried out in French, which is also the language mostly used for public communication, with written official statements, advertising displays and road signs generally in French. Due to the historical influence of the Napoleonic Code on the legal system of the Grand Duchy, French is also the sole language of the legislation and generally the preferred language of the government, administration and justice. Parliamentary debates are mostly conducted in Luxembourgish, whereas written government communications and official documents (e.g. administrative or judicial decisions, passports, etc.) are drafted mostly in French and sometimes additionally in German.

Although professional life is largely multilingual, French is described by private sector business leaders as the main working language of their companies (56%), followed by Luxembourgish (20%), English (18%), and German (6%).

German is very often used in much of the media along with French and is considered by most Luxembourgers their second language. This is mostly due to the high similarity of German to Luxembourgish but also because it is the first language taught to children in primary school (language of literacy acquisition).

Due to the large community of Portuguese origin, the Portuguese language is fairly prevalent in Luxembourg, though it remains limited to the relationships inside this community. Portuguese has no official status, but the administration sometimes makes certain informative documents available in Portuguese.

Even though Luxembourg is largely multilingual today, some people claim that Luxembourg is subject of intense francization and that Luxembourgish and German are in danger of disappearing in the country, making Luxembourg either a unilingual Francophone country, or at best a bilingual French- and English-speaking country sometime in the far future.

Religion

Luxembourg is a secular state, but the state recognizes certain religions as officially mandated religions. This gives the state a hand in religious administration and appointment of clergy, in exchange for which the state pays certain running costs and wages. Religions covered by such arrangements are Catholicism, Judaism, Greek Orthodoxy, Anglicanism, Russian Orthodoxy, Lutheranism, Calvinism, Mennonitism, and Islam.

Since 1980, it has been illegal for the government to collect statistics on religious beliefs or practices. A 2000 estimate by the CIA Factbook is that 87% of Luxembourgers are Catholic, including the grand ducal family, with the remaining 13% being Protestants, Orthodox Christians, Jews, Muslims, and those of other or no religion. According to a 2010 Pew Research Center study, 70.4% are Christian, 2.3% Muslim, 26.8% unaffiliated, and 0.5% other religions.

According to a 2005 Eurobarometer poll, 44% of Luxembourg citizens responded that "they believe there is a God", whereas 28% answered that "they believe there is some sort of spirit or life force", and 22% that "they do not believe there is any sort of spirit, god, or life force".

Education 

Luxembourg's education system is trilingual: the first years of primary school are in Luxembourgish, before changing to German; while in secondary school, the language of instruction changes to French. Proficiency in all three languages is required for graduation from secondary school, but half the students leave school without a certified qualification, with the children of immigrants being particularly disadvantaged. In addition to the three national languages, English is taught in compulsory schooling and much of the population of Luxembourg can speak English. The past two decades have highlighted the growing importance of English in several sectors, in particular the financial sector. Portuguese, the language of the largest immigrant community, is also spoken by large segments of the population, but by relatively few from outside the Portuguese-speaking community.
 
The University of Luxembourg is the only university based in Luxembourg. In 2014, Luxembourg School of Business, a graduate business school, was created through private initiative and received the accreditation from the Ministry of Higher Education and Research of Luxembourg in 2017. Two American universities maintain satellite campuses in the country: Miami University (Dolibois European Center) and Sacred Heart University (Luxembourg Campus).

Health 

According to data from the World Health Organization, healthcare spending on behalf of the government of Luxembourg topped $4.1 Billion, amounting to about $8,182 for each citizen in the nation. The nation of Luxembourg collectively spent nearly 7% of its Gross Domestic Product on health, placing it among the highest spending countries on health services and related programs in 2010 among other well-off nations in Europe with high average income among its population.

Culture 

Luxembourg has been heavily influenced by the culture of its neighbors. It retains a number of folk traditions, having been for much of its history a profoundly rural country. There are several notable museums, located mostly in the capital. These include the National Museum of History and Art (NMHA), the Luxembourg City History Museum, and the new Grand Duke Jean Museum of Modern Art (Mudam). The National Museum of Military History (MNHM) in Diekirch is especially known for its representations of the Battle of the Bulge. The city of Luxembourg itself is on the UNESCO World Heritage List, on account of the historical importance of its fortifications.

The country has produced some internationally known artists, including the painters Théo Kerg, Joseph Kutter and Michel Majerus, and photographer Edward Steichen, whose The Family of Man exhibition has been placed on UNESCO's Memory of the World register, and is now permanently housed in Clervaux. Editor and author Hugo Gernsback, whose publications crystallized the concept of science fiction, was born in Luxembourg City. Movie star Loretta Young was of Luxembourgish descent.

Luxembourg was a founding participant of the Eurovision Song Contest, and participated every year between 1956 and 1993, with the exception of 1959. It won the competition a total of five times, 1961, 1965, 1972, 1973 and 1983 and hosted the contest in 1962, 1966, 1973, and 1984, but only nine of its 38 entries were performed by Luxembourgish artists.

Luxembourg was the first city to be named European Capital of Culture twice. The first time was in 1995. In 2007, the European Capital of Culture was to be a cross-border area consisting of the Grand Duchy of Luxembourg, the Rheinland-Pfalz and Saarland in Germany, the Walloon Region and the German-speaking part of Belgium, and the Lorraine area in France. The event was an attempt to promote mobility and the exchange of ideas, crossing borders physically, psychologically, artistically and emotionally.

Luxembourg was represented at the World Expo 2010 in Shanghai, China, from 1 May to 31 October 2010 with its own pavilion. The pavilion was based on the transliteration of the word Luxembourg into Chinese, "Lu Sen Bao", which means "Forest and Fortress". It represented Luxembourg as the "Green Heart in Europe".

Sports 
 
 

Unlike most countries in Europe, sports in Luxembourg are not concentrated upon a particular national sport, but instead encompass a number of sports, both team and individual. Despite the lack of a central sporting focus, over 100,000 people in Luxembourg, out of a total population of near 500,000–600,000, are licensed members of one sports federation or another. The Stade de Luxembourg, situated in Gasperich, southern Luxembourg City, is the country's national stadium and largest sports venue in the country with a capacity of 9,386 for sporting events, including football and rugby union, and 15,000 for concerts. The largest indoor venue in the country is d'Coque, Kirchberg, north-eastern Luxembourg City, which has a capacity of 8,300. The arena is used for basketball, handball, gymnastics, and volleyball, including the final of the 2007 Women's European Volleyball Championship.

Cuisine 

Luxembourg cuisine reflects its position on the border between the Latin and Germanic worlds, being heavily influenced by the cuisines of neighboring France and Germany. More recently, it has been enriched by its many Italian and Portuguese immigrants.

Most native Luxembourg dishes, consumed as the traditional daily fare, share roots in the country's folk dishes, the same as in neighboring Germany.

Luxembourg sells the most alcohol in Europe per capita. However, the large proportion of alcohol purchased by customers from neighboring countries contributes to the statistically high level of alcohol sales per capita; this level of alcohol sales is thus not representative of the actual alcohol consumption of the Luxembourg population.

Luxembourg has the second highest number of Michelin-starred restaurants per capita with Japan ranked at number one and Switzerland following Luxembourg at number three.

Media 
The main languages of media in Luxembourg are French and German. The newspaper with the largest circulation is the German-language daily Luxemburger Wort. Because of the strong multilingualism in Luxembourg, newspapers often alternate articles in French and articles in German, without translation. In addition, there are both English and Portuguese radio and national print publications, but accurate audience figures are difficult to gauge since the national media survey by ILRES is conducted in French.

Luxembourg is known in Europe for its radio and television stations (Radio Luxembourg and RTL Group). It is also the uplink home of SES, carrier of major European satellite services for Germany and Britain.

Due to a 1988 law that established a special tax scheme for audiovisual investment, the film and co-production in Luxembourg has grown steadily. There are some 30 registered production companies in Luxembourg.

Luxembourg won an Oscar in 2014 in the Animated Short Films category with Mr Hublot.

Notable Luxembourgers

See also 

 Outline of Luxembourg
 Disability in Luxembourg

References

Informational notes

Citations

Works cited

Further reading 
 
 Plan d'action national luxembourgeois en matière de TIC et de haut-débit
 CEE- Europe's Digital Competitiveness Report –Volume 2: i2010 –ICT Country Profiles- page 40-41
 Inauguration of LU-CIX
 Art and Culture in Luxembourg

External links 

 The Official Portal of the Grand Duchy of Luxembourg
 Luxembourg from UCB Libraries GovPubs
 Luxembourg. The World Factbook. Central Intelligence Agency.
 
 Luxembourg profile from the BBC News
 Luxembourg's Constitution of 1868 with Amendments through 2009, English Translation 2012
 

 
Countries in Europe
Duchy of Luxembourg
French-speaking countries and territories
German-speaking countries and territories
Landlocked countries
Member states of NATO
Member states of the European Union
Member states of the Organisation internationale de la Francophonie
Member states of the Union for the Mediterranean
Member states of the United Nations
NUTS 1 statistical regions of the European Union
NUTS 2 statistical regions of the European Union
States and territories established in 1815
States of the German Confederation
Northwestern European countries
Countries of Europe with multiple official languages
OECD members